Pristimantis medemi is a species of frog in the family Strabomantidae. The species is endemic to Colombia.

Etymology
The specific name, medemi, is in honor of Federico Medem, who was a Colombian herpetologist of Baltic German descent.

Distribution and habitat
The natural habitats of P. medemi are tropical moist lowland forests, moist montane forests, rivers, plantations, rural gardens, and heavily degraded former forest.

Conservation status
P. medemi is threatened by habitat loss.

References

medemi
Amphibians of Colombia
Endemic fauna of Colombia
Amphibians described in 1994
Taxonomy articles created by Polbot